The 73d Air Division is an inactive United States Air Force unit. Its last assignment was with Air Defense Command at Tyndall Air Force Base, Florida, where it was inactivated on 1 April 1966.

History

World War II

The 73d Bombardment Wing was activated as part of Second Air Force on 17 February 1943. Its original mission was to process personnel assigned to Boeing B-17 Flying Fortress and Consolidated B-24 Liberator Replacement Training Units (RTU) based in the midwest. It was inactivated on 15 October 1943 with the drawdown of heavy bomber training.

The wing was reactivated and redesignated as the 73d Bombardment Wing (Very Heavy) on 20 November 1943 at Smoky Hill Army Air Field, Kansas. The new Boeing B-29 Superfortress wing was assigned four newly organized groups (the 497th, 498th, 499th and 500th Bombardment Groups), which were training in New Mexico and Arizona with B-17s and B-24s, due to a lack of B-29 aircraft. In April 1944, the groups were brought to several airfields in Kansas (Great Bend Army Air Field, Smoky Hill Army Air Field and Walker Army Air Field) where they were equipped with new B-29s manufactured by Boeing at their Wichita, Kansas plant.

By August the wing's groups had completed their training and their aircraft were readied for deployment. Originally assigned to Twentieth Air Force's XX Bomber Command in India, the wing was instead assigned to the new XXI Bomber Command in the Pacific Theater. The 73d Wing deployed to newly constructed airfields on Saipan in the Northern Mariana Islands.   The 73d Bomb Wing was the first B-29 wing to be assigned to the Marianas, and the first B-29 of the 497th Bomb Group arrived at Isely Field, Saipan on 12 October 1944. The 498th arrived shortly after, with the 499th and 500th Bomb Groups arriving in early November.  By 22 November, over 100 B-29s were on Saipan. The XXI Bomber Command was assigned the task of destroying the aircraft industry of Japan in a series of high-altitude, daylight precision attacks

In late October and early November 1944, a series of tactical raids were carried out as training exercises for the crews. From Saipan, the groups of the 73d Bomb Wing flew several bombing missions against Truk to gain combat experience. Aware that there was now a new threat, Japanese aircraft based on Iwo Jima staged a low-level raid on Isely Field on 2 November, damaging several B-29s on the ground. Retaliatory strikes were ordered on Iwo Jima on 5 and 11 November.

In November 1944, the groups of the 73rd began bombing Japan, with only moderate success. Poor weather, the lack of precision radar bombing equipment, and tremendous winds encountered at high altitudes over Japan made accuracy difficult.  The initial raids against Japan had taken place at high altitudes in order to stay above anti-aircraft fire and the effective altitude of defending fighters. Tactics were changed and high-altitude, daylight attacks be phased out and replaced by low-altitude, high-intensity incendiary raids at nighttime. The aircraft would attack individually, which meant that no assembly over the base at the start of the mission or along the way would be needed.

Consequently, it turned to devastating low altitude incendiary attacks. The Division continued attacking urban areas until the end of the war in August 1945, its subordinate units conducted raids against strategic objectives, bombing aircraft factories, chemical plants, oil refineries, and other targets in Japan. The wing flew its last combat missions on 14 August when hostilities ended. Afterwards, the wing's B 29s carried relief supplies to Allied prisoner of war camps in Japan and Manchuria.

The 73d and its subordinate units demobilized rapidly after V-J Day, and the wing's four bomb groups were all returned to the United States, with their B-29s either being flown to Clark Field for scrapping, or to storage facilities in Texas or Arizona. The 73d Bomb Wing was reassigned to the United States in December 1945, where it was assigned first to Continental Air Force's Fourth Air Force, then to Strategic Air Command (SAC) on 21 March 1946. However demobilization was in full swing and few SAC units were actually equipped and manned. The 73d wing was inactivated on 31 March.

Air Force Reserve
In 1947, the 73d Bomb Wing was reactivated with the 338th and 351st Bombardment Groups being assigned to it, both reserve B-29 Superfortress organizations. A third group, the 381st Bombardment Group was added in 1948. However SAC was having enough difficulties keeping its front-line active duty B-29 bomb units in the air to maintain even minimal pilot proficiency in the late 1940s. The wing and its bomb groups were all inactivated in 1949.

Air Defense Command
The organization was reactivated as part of Air Defense Command (ADC) in 1957 as the 73d Air Division. As part of ADC, it evaluated, upgraded, and determined the proficiency of the Air Defense Command fighter-interceptor and missile squadrons, 1 July 1957 – 1 April 1966. The division developed and tested Air Defense Command tactics, equipment, aircraft, guided missiles, and related equipment and armaments. It also maintained active contact with Army, Navy, and other Air Force commands to assure coordinated military effort in the use of rocket and missile ranges, defense plans, air sea land rescue, and airspace and airways directly concerned with the operations of the Air Defense Command Weapons Center.

The 73d Air Division was inactivated on 1 April 1966.

Lineage
 Constituted as the 5th Heavy Bombardment Processing Headquarters on 9 February 1943.
 Activated on 17 February 1943
 Redesignated 73d Bombardment Operational Training Wing (Heavy) on 12 August 1943.
 Inactivated on 15 October 1943
 Redesignated 73d Bombardment Wing, Very Heavy on 19 November 1943
 Activated on 20 November 1943
 Redesignated 73d Bombardment Wing, Very Heavy, Special on 13 January 1944
 Redesignated 73d Bombardment Wing, Very Heavy on 24 June 1944
 Inactivated on 31 May 1946
 Activated in the reserve on 12 June 1947
 Redesignated 73d Air Division, Bombardment on 16 April 1948
 Inactivated on 27 June 1949
 Redesignated 73d Air Division (Weapons) on 1 April 1957
 Activated on 1 July 1957
 Redesignated 73d Air Division on 1 March 1963
 Discontinued and inactivated on 1 April 1966

Assignments

 Second Air Force, 12 August 1945 – 15 October 1943
 XX Bomber Command, 20 November 1943
 Second Air Force, 2 June 1944 – 30 July 1944
 Twentieth Air Force, c. 6 August 1944
 XXI Bomber Command, 9 November 1944 – 16 July 1945
 Twentieth Air Force, 16 July 1945
 Fourth Air Force, 7 December 1945
 Third Air Force, 5 January 1946
 Strategic Air Command, 21 March 1946
 Fifteenth Air Force, 31 March 1946 – 31 May 1946
 Tenth Air Force, 1 July 1948 – 27 June 1949
 Air Defense Command, 1 July 1957 – 1 April 1966

Components

Sector
 Montgomery Air Defense Sector: 1 October 1964 – 1 April 1966
 Gunter Air Force Base, Alabama

Wings

 4750th Air Defense Wing: 1 July 1957 – 25 June 1960
 Vincent Air Force Base, Arizona
 4751st Air Defense Wing: 15 January 1958 – 1 October 1959
 Eglin Auxiliary Field #9, Florida
 4756th Air Defense Wing: 1 July 1957 – 1 July 1960
 4756th Air Defense Wing: 1 September 1962 – 1 April 1966
 4780th Air Defense Wing: 1 July 1962 – 1 April 1966
 Perrin Air Force Base, Texas

Groups
Operational Groups

 338th Bombardment Group: 17 October 1947 – 27 June 1949
 351st Bombardment Group: 17 October 1947 – 4 June 1948
 Scott Field (later Scott Air Force Base), Illinois
 381st Bombardment Group: 4 June 1948 – 27 June 1949
 Offutt Air Force Base, Nebraska
 497th Bombardment Group: 20 November 1943 – 31 March 1946
 498th Bombardment Group: 20 November 1943 – 31 May 1946
 499th Bombardment Group: 20 November 1943 – 16 February 1946
 500th Bombardment Group: 20 November 1943 – 17 January 1946
 4756th Air Defense Group: 1 July 1960 – 1 September 1962

Support Groups

 65th Air Service Group
 91st Air Service Group
 303d Air Service Group
 330th Air Service Group
 4756th Air Base Group: 1 July 1960 – 1 September 1962

Stations
 Walker Army Air Field, 17 February 1943
 Smoky Hill Army Airfield, Kansas, 30 June – 15 October 1943; 20 November 1943
 Colorado Springs, Colorado, 29 February – 17 July 1944
 Isely Field, Saipan, Mariana Islands, 24 August 1944 – 20 October 1945
 MacDill Field, Florida, 15 January – 31 May 1946.
 Orchard Place Airport, Illinois, 12 June 1947 – 29 June 1949.
 Tyndall Air Force Base, Florida, 1 July 1957 – 1 April 1966

Aircraft

 Boeing B-29 Superfortress, 1943–1946
 Martin B-57E Canberra, c. 1957 – c. 1960
 North American F-86D Sabre, c. 1955 – c. 1957
 Convair F-102 Delta Dagger, c. 1957 – c. 1966
 Lockheed F-104 Starfighter, c. 1957 – c. 1960
 Lockheed T-33 Shooting Star, c. 1957 – 1966
 McDonnell F-101 Voodoo, c. 1960 – c. 1966
 Convair F-106 Delta Dart, c. 1960 – c. 1966

See also

 List of USAF Aerospace Defense Command General Surveillance Radar Stations
 Aerospace Defense Command Fighter Squadrons
 List of United States Air Force air divisions

References

Notes
 Explanatory notes

 Citations

Bibliography

External links
 March Field Museum B-29 from the 500th Bomb Wing

Japan campaign
World War II aerial operations and battles of the Pacific theatre
073
Aerospace Defense Command units